In 2010-11 season NSA Sofia won their 7th consecutive league trophy and participate for 6th time in row in UEFA Women's Champions League.

Table

Matches

A PFG

Bulgarian Cup

UEFA Champions League

References

External links
 http://www.bulgarian-football.com/bg/archive/201011/wdp.html#dp

Nsa Sofia